Todor Stoimenov (born 22 August 1958) is a Bulgarian sports shooter. He competed in the mixed 25 metre rapid fire pistol event at the 1980 Summer Olympics.

References

1958 births
Living people
Bulgarian male sport shooters
Olympic shooters of Bulgaria
Shooters at the 1980 Summer Olympics
Place of birth missing (living people)
20th-century Bulgarian people